Sitamarhi Junction railway station is a main railway station in Sitamarhi district, Bihar. Its code is SMI. It serves Sitamarhi City. The station consists of five platforms. It is an A category railway station of the Samastipur railway division.

The Sitamarhi Junction is well connected to most of the major cities in India like Patna, Delhi, Mumbai, Kolkata, Kanpur, Guwahati, Lucknow, Varanasi, Allahabad and other cities by the railway network and serves the city with numerous trains. It is also the originating station for five superfasts and express trains.

The Darbhanga–Sitamarhi–Raxaul track was converted to broad gauge in February 2014. Another broad-gauge track connects Sitamarhi to Muzaffarpur.

The major facilities available are waiting rooms, retiring room, a computerized reservation facility, reservation counter, vehicle parking, etc.

There are refreshment rooms, vegetarian and non-vegetarian foodstuffs, tea stall, book stall, post and telegraphic office and Government Railway police office.

Nearby railway stations 

Bhisa Halt railway station
Dumra railway station
Tapaswinarayan Nagar Halt railway station
Parsauni railway station
Janakpur Road railway station

Trains

 Kolkata–Sitamarhi Express
 Mithilanchal Express
 Raxaul–Lokmanya Tilak Terminus Karmabhoomi Express
 Howrah–Raxaul Express
 Lichchavi Express
 Sadbhavna Express (via Sitamarhi)
 New Jalpaiguri–Sitamarhi Weekly Express
 Sadbhavna Express (via Faizabad)
 Kamakhya–Shri Mata Vaishno Devi Katra Express
 Sealdah–Muzaffarpur Express
 Patliputra–Raxaul DEMU

References

Railway stations in Sitamarhi district
Railway junction stations in Bihar
Samastipur railway division
Transport in Sitamarhi